La Ricamarie is a commune in the Loire department in central France. It is situated between the city of Saint-Etienne and the town of Firminy.

Population

Twin towns
La Ricamarie is twinned with:

  Pyskowice, Poland, since 1998

See also
Communes of the Loire department

References

Communes of Loire (department)